Team Whistle (formerly known as Whistle or Whistle Sports) is an American digital media company focused on sports-related and entertainment content.

History
Since its launch in 2014, Whistle Sports has raised more than $56 million in funding to date. It raised $8 million in 2014, mostly from Sky Broadcasting, $28 million in a second round in 2015, and $20 million in a third round in 2016. The company's investors and equity holders include Tegna, Inc., NBC Sports, Sky Sports, Liberty Global, and Emil Capital, as well as multiple professional sports leagues.

In addition, the company has had partnerships with Nickelodeon with "Top Ten Trick Shots," and Wilson for their #MyWilson campaign.

In 2018, Leeds United majority owner Andrea Radrizzani's company Aser led a $28 million funding round. In March 2021, Team Whistle was acquired by Aser via its Eleven Group subsidiary.

References

Multi-channel networks